The Associated Gospel Churches, commonly known as AGC, is a Canadian evangelical Christian denomination. It is affiliated with the Evangelical Fellowship of Canada. The national headquarters are located in Burlington, Ontario, Canada.

History 
The Associated Gospel Churches can trace its origins to the 1890s, when the AGC began a group of independent churches, in Ontario, Canada, that was joined together by a charter under the leadership of Dr. P. W. Philpott. In 1922, the group was named the Christian Workers' Church of Canada. To differentiate itself from similarly named, but theological differing groups, the denomination was renamed Associated Gospel Churches in 1925. It was federally incorporated March 18, 1925.

The AGC began its first expansion outside of Ontario in 1940, when a group of churches based in Western Canada sought to affiliate themselves with AGC. This group of churches eventually became what is now known as AGC West Region.

In 1944, the AGC began expanding its English language ministries into the Canadian province of Quebec, and began its first French language ministries in 1972.

In 2020, it had 152 churches.

Leadership
In June 2018, a vote was taken at the AGC National Conference in Niagara Falls, Ontario, with a 99 per cent approval for Bill Allan to become the association's fifth full-time President.

Previous Presidents:

 Bill Fietje (2008-2018)
 Bud Penner (2000-2008)
 Don Hamilton (1989-1998)
 Bill Sifft (1981-1989)

Fair Havens Ministries  
Fair Havens Ministries is a Bible Conference and Christian retreat centre, owned and operated by the Associated Gospel Churches (AGC). It is located near Beaverton, Ontario, about 120 km (or 75 miles) north of Toronto.

AGC leadership 
 Bill Allan - President of AGC
 Tom Lambshead - AGC East Regional Director
 Russ Wilson - AGC West Regional Director
 Del Gibbons - AGC Quebec Regional Director
 Lorne Meisner - AGC West Associate Regional Director
 Glenn Rider - National Coordinator of Doctrine & Credentials
 Elizabeth Thompson - Executive Director of Fair Havens Ministries

References

External links
Associated Gospel Churches - Official website
Fair Havens Ministries

Evangelicalism in Canada
Evangelical denominations in North America